

Broadcast teams
ESPN did not have fixed broadcast teams during the 1985–86 season. Sam Rosen, Ken Wilson, Jim Hughson, Dan Kelly, Mike Lange, Jiggs McDonald, Jim Kelly, Mike Emrick, and Mike Patrick handled the play-by-play, and Mickey Redmond, Bill Clement, John Davidson, Gary Dornhoefer, Phil Esposito, and Brad Park provided color commentary.

The NHL and ESPN announced a new 7-year deal beginning in the 2021–22 season.

Stanley Cup playoffs

Studio personalities

Hosts
 Steve Levy: Studio host (1993–2004); lead studio host (2021–present)
John Buccigross: Studio host (1998–2004, 2021–present)
Linda Cohn: Studio host (2021–present)
Arda Ocal: Studio host (2021–present)

Analysts
Barry Melrose: Lead studio analyst (1996–2004, 2021–present)
Mark Messier: Lead studio analyst/color commentator (2021–present)
Chris Chelios: Lead studio analyst/color commentator (2021–present)
Ryan Callahan: Color commentator/studio analyst (2021–present)
Rick DiPietro: Studio analyst (2021–present)
Kevin Weekes: Color commentator/studio analyst (2021–present)
Dominic Moore: Color commentator/studio analyst (2021–present)
Brian Boucher: #2 Color commentator/studio analyst (2021–present)
A. J. Mleczko: Color commentator/studio analyst (2021-present)
Hilary Knight: Studio analyst/Inside the Glass analyst (2022–present)
P. K. Subban: Studio analyst/color commentator (2022–present)

Former personalities 
Chris Berman: Stanley Cup Finals host (2003–2004)
Scotty Bowman: Studio analyst if Detroit Red Wings missed or eliminated from Stanley Cup playoffs
Bill Clement: Studio analyst (1992–93 regular season)
Brian Engblom: Studio analyst (1992–2004)
Ray Ferraro: Lead studio analyst (2002–2004)
E.J. Hradek: Insider (1992–2004)
Jim Kelly: Studio host (1985–86)
Tom Mees: lead studio host (1985–88, 1992–93)
Mike Milbury: Lead studio analyst (1995)
Al Morganti: Studio analyst (1992–2004)
Eddie Olczyk: Studio analyst (2002–2004)
Darren Pang: Studio analyst (1992–2004)
Bill Patrick: Studio host
Bill Pidto: Studio host (1995–1998)
John Saunders: Alternate studio host (1987–88), Lead studio host (1992–2004)
Jim Schoenfeld: Studio analyst (1993 Stanley Cup playoffs)
John Tortorella: Studio analyst (2021–2022)

Reporters

Current personalities 
Blake Bolden (2022–present)
Linda Cohn (2021–present)
Leah Hextall (2021–present)
Emily Kaplan (2021–present)
Greg Wyshynski (2021–present)

Former personalities 
Erin Andrews (2004)
Brenda Brenon (1994)
Brian Engblom (1992–2003)
Jim Kelly (1985–86)
Matt Lauer (1988)
Steve Levy (1992–2004)
Brian McFarlane (1985–86)
Tom Mees (1986–87, 1992–93)
Joe Micheletti (1999–2004)
Al Morganti (1992–2002)
Darren Pang (1995–2004)
Sam Ryan (2003–2004)

Insiders 
Emily Kaplan: (2017–present)
Greg Wyshynski: (2017–present)

References

National Hockey Night personalities
ESPN